Earl Caldwell (born c. 1939) is an American journalist. He documented the Black Panthers from the inside in the 1969, and became embroiled in a key U.S. Supreme Court decision clarifying reporters' rights. The case started when the FBI tried to press Caldwell to be an informant against the Black Panther Party. He worked for The New York Times, the New York Daily News, The New York Amsterdam News and is currently on the radio in New York City. His career as a journalist spans more than four decades. He witnessed and chronicled some of the most important civil rights events from the 1960s onwards and was the only reporter present when Martin Luther King Jr. was assassinated. Caldwell is a founding member of the steering committee of the Maynard Institute for Journalism Education, as well as the Washington-based Reporters Committee for Freedom of the Press. In 2009 he was inducted into the National Association of Black Journalists Hall of Fame.

Biography
Caldwell started his career at The Progress in Clearfield, Pennsylvania, and went on to work for the Intelligencer Journal in Lancaster, Pennsylvania, and the Democrat and Chronicle in Rochester, New York.

He rose to fame while a reporter at The New York Times when he refused to disclose information to the FBI and the Nixon administration involving his sources in the Black Panther party. The case, United States v. Caldwell, reached the U.S. Supreme Court in 1972 when the court ruled against him. The “Caldwell Case” led to the enactment of shield laws in many states that allow reporters to protect sources and information. In addition to his work for The New York Times, Caldwell wrote for the New York Daily News.

Caldwell is writer-in-residence at the Robert C. Maynard Institute for Journalism Education in Oakland, California, where he is writing The Caldwell Journals, a serialized account of the black journalist movement spawned by the 1960s civil rights movement. He previously served as the Scripps Howard Endowed Chair at Hampton University.

In addition to teaching, he has organized efforts to videotape/audiotape African-American journalists selected for an oral history collection.

Career highlights
Reporting for The New York Times, Caldwell went coast-to-coast to cover the riots that swept black America in the summers of 1967 and 1968. He was the lone reporter to witness the assassination of Martin Luther King Jr. at the Lorraine Motel in Memphis in April 1968 and he was on the streets of Chicago in 1968, covering the riots as the police challenged demonstrators during the Democratic National Convention.

Caldwell covered the trial of Angela Davis, the controversial black scholar accused of a central role in the murder of a Marin County, California, judge during an escape attempt from San Quentin Prison. He also spent months in Atlanta covering the child murders and the subsequent trial of convicted killer Wayne Williams. Caldwell traveled the campaign trail with the Rev. Jesse Jackson during his historic run for the presidency in 1984, and in Africa he covered the fall of the white regime and election of the first black government in Zimbabwe.

Caldwell broke a barrier in New York City in 1979 when he became the first black journalist to write a regular column in a major daily newspaper, the New York Daily News. In April 1994, three years before the Abner Louima incident, he reported the story of six Haitian male cab drivers who came forward after being raped and sodomized by a police officer. The officer used his service revolver, uniform, and the police van for the attacks. The city did nothing. Caldwell was fired from the Daily News, and was afterward unable to find work in the mainstream press.

Supreme Court
The central case in the United States Supreme Court's defining of reporters' rights was the United States v. Caldwell in 1972. This was based on Caldwell, then with The New York Times, refusing to appear before a federal grand jury and disclose confidential information involving his sources in the Black Panther Party. In a historic ruling, the United States Court of Appeals for the Ninth Circuit supported Caldwell’s position. Later on, however, that decision was reversed. However, in an apparent conflict of interest, the deciding vote was cast by then Associate Justice William Rehnquist, who, as a U.S. Justice Department lawyer, had been intimately involved in the Caldwell case.

Current activities
The Caldwell Chronicle radio program (Friday 4-6 p.m.) originates at WBAI (99.5 FM), the Pacifica radio outlet in New York, and can be heard live over the Internet (www.wbai.org).
Writer-in-Residence at Hampton University, VA in addition to teaching, he has organized efforts to videotape/audiotape African-American journalists selected for an oral history collection.

Books 
 Walker, Kenneth; Caldwell, Earl; Rackley, Lurma. Black American Witness: Reports from the Front (1994). Lion House Pub.

References

Sources
 Terry, Wallace. Missing Pages: Black Journalists of Modern America: An Oral History (2007) Carroll & Graf
 Moore, Jimmy Lee. Democracy, Race, and Privacy: The Hypocritical Failures of the United States

External links
 Biography at reportingcivilrights.org
 Earl Caldwell's oral history video excerpts at The National Visionary Leadership Project
 
 Interview with Earl Caldwell June 2001 Maynard Institute (Oral History Collection)

American male journalists
1930s births
Living people